The National Yang Ming Chiao Tung University School of Law ("NYCU Law") is a postgraduate law school located on the campus of National Yang Ming Chiao Tung University in Hsinchu, Taiwan. NYCU Law began as the "Intellectual Property Management" Program in 1993, and then the Institute of Technology Law ("ITL") in 2000. The ITL was transformed into the National Chiao Tung University School of Law in 2015. In February 2021, because of the combination of National Yang-Ming University and National Chiao Tung University, the National Chiao Tung University School of Law was renamed the National Yang Ming Chiao Tung University School of Law. Its programs award advanced degrees including master's degrees as well as doctorate degrees. It is a postgraduate professional school, aiming to provide legal training for students already having bachelor's or more advanced degrees, and focuses on a cross-disciplinary legal education environment. Of note, NYCU Law stands out as one of the few law schools in Taiwan that teaches Anglo-American common law systems, alongside traditional civil law systems.

Student body
As a result of providing courses focusing on inter-disciplinary needs, as well as an emphasis on intellectual property right laws and the American common law system, NYCU Law hosts a more diverse student body than most of the traditional law schools or departments in Taiwan, where the mainstream has been awarding bachelor's degrees in law and accepting only those with a prior law degree into more advanced legal programs. NYCU Law recruits students with a legal educational background, such as those with a first or more advanced law degree, and also students from other academical disciplines, such as literature, science, or engineering. NYCU Law accepts full-time students and part-time students, among which include those in the legal professions such as judges, prosecutors, lawyers, and counsels who seek more advanced study, and those with technical backgrounds including engineers, salespersons, and businesspersons, a lot of them being from corporations from the nearby Hsinchu Science Park, who intend to acquire knowledge of law.

Faculty
The faculty at NYCU Law are contributors throughout the world in a broad range of scholarly fields, including the advancement of legal education. The NYCU School of Law has 14 full-time faculty members and a diverse body of adjunct faculty consisting of experienced judges, prosecutors, attorneys, and entrepreneurs. Together, the faculty provides a full spectrum of learning opportunities for students.

NYCU Law Review
The NYCU Law Review endorses the ideals of internationalization of jurisprudence, empirical studies of law, and interdisciplinary integration. The journal promotes innovative legal studies, believing that jurisprudence should reflect social realities as well as pursue fairness and justice. The journal also aims to serve as a platform for interdisciplinary dialogue.

Reputation
The NYCU School of Law has become Taiwan’s center for intellectual property and technology law studies. NYCU School of Law organizes the annual “National Technology Law Conference,” hosting hundreds of scholars and legal professionals, as well as business managers and government officials to discuss a wide range of topics from intellectual property law to business strategy. In 2022, NYCU Law was ranked 201–250 in the world in the subject of law and the 3rd best law school in Taiwan by the QS World University Rankings.

The six concentrations
NYCU Law has six main areas of research: Intellectual Property Law; Business Law, Corporate Governance, and White-Collar Crime; Gender Equality, Labor Rights, and Social Justice; Biotechnology and Health Law; Transnational Law and International Negotiation; and Information Communication and Competition Law.

Research Centers
The NYCU School of Law hosts research centers producing research and engaging in interdisciplinary legal studies. These research centers include: Center for Digital Governance and Legal Innovation, Center for Enterprise & Entrepreneurship, Center for Trans-Pacific Partnership and Transnational Trade Laws, and Research Center for Financial Regulation and Corporate Governance. The activities of these centers vary. For example, the Center for Digital Governance and Legal Innovation sponsors the Digital Law Asia website, a platform aimed at bringing together leading and emerging scholars, practitioners, and experts to contribute scholarly discussions and critical perspectives on matters relating to digital law in Asia.

International Cooperation
The NYCU School of Law maintains cooperative relationships with many law schools, including the law schools at Duke University, Singapore Management University, University of Wisconsin-Madison, University of Neuchatel, and the Robert H. McKinney School of Law at Indiana University. These cooperations include short-term exchange meetings, reciprocal exchange of credits program, even dual degree programs. The NYCU School of Law is a member of the International Association of Law Schools, Asian Law Institute, and the Asian Law Schools Association.

See also
 National Yang Ming Chiao Tung University

References

External links
 National Yang Ming Chiao Tung University School of Law

School of Law
Law schools in the Republic of China